Asiagomphus cuneatus is a clubtail dragonfly whose naiads are commonly eaten in parts of Yunnan, China. The species was first described by Needham in 1930.

References 

 Chen et al. (2009) Common edible insects and their utilization in China. Entomological Research 39:299-303
 Ying et al. (2001) Three edible odonata species and their nutritive value. Forest Research 14:421-424
 Needham (1930) Zool Sinica A 11:50

External links 

 Insects as food Chen et al. (2009)
 Nutritive value Ying et al. (2001)

Gomphidae
Insects described in 1930